The Foundation for Jewish Camp (FJC), formerly known as the Foundation for Jewish Camping, is a 501(c)(3) nonprofit serving North America.  It serves as an advocate and resource for nonprofit Jewish camp professionals, lay leaders, families and others interested in the field.

In 2008, the Overnight Camp Incentive Program provided grant money to 18 campers to attend Pinemere Camp. The program is a joint project of the Neubauer Family Foundation, the Foundation for Jewish Camp, and the Jewish Federation of Greater Philadelphia.  The grants ranged from $750 to $1,250.  The majority of the Pinemere campers who received grants chose to return the following summer.

References

External links
Foundation for Jewish Camp

Summer camps